HMS Penn was a Repeat  which served with the Royal Navy during the First World War. The M class were an improvement on the preceding , capable of higher speed. The ship was named after William Penn, the father of the founder of Pennsylvania. Launched on 8 April 1916, the vessel served with the Grand Fleet forming part of the screen for the dreadnought battleships of the 1st Battle Squadron and escorting the aircraft carrier  in battle. The destroyer participated in the Actions of 19 August 1916 and 16 October 1917, as well as forming part of the distant support during the Second Battle of Heligoland Bight. Penn was also instrumental in rescuing the survivors from the light cruiser , sunk by a German submarine. After the Armistice that ended the war, the destroyer was placed in reserve and subsequently sold to be broken up on 9 May 1921.

Design and development
Penn was one of sixteen Repeat s ordered by the British Admiralty in May 1915 as part of the Fifth War Construction Programme. The M-class was an improved version of the earlier  destroyers, required to reach a higher speed in order to counter rumoured German fast destroyers. It transpired that the German ships did not exist but the greater performance was appreciated by the navy. The Repeat M class differed from prewar vessels in having a raked stem and design improvements based on wartime experience.

Displacement was  normal and  full load. Three funnels were fitted.

Armament consisted of three single QF  Mk IV guns on the ship's centreline, with one on the forecastle, one aft on a raised platform and one between the middle and aft funnels. Torpedo armament consisted of two twin mounts for  torpedoes. A single QF 2-pounder  "pom-pom" anti-aircraft gun was mounted between the torpedo tubes. For anti-submarine warfare, Penn was equipped with two depth charge chutes. The number of depth charges carried increased as the war progressed. The ship had a complement of 80 officers and ratings.

Construction and career
Penn was laid down by John Brown & Company of Clydebank, alongside sister ship , on 9 June 1915 with the yard number 447, launched on 8 April the following year and completed on 31 May. The vessel was the first to be named after the naval officer Admiral William Penn, the father of the founder of Pennsylvania. The vessel was deployed as part of the Grand Fleet, joining the Thirteenth Destroyer Flotilla.

The destroyer spent most of the war as part of the screen for the 1st Battle Squadron. A key role was to protect the dreadnought battleships of the squadron from German submarines. As part in the Action of 19 August 1916, the ship was dispatched to support the light cruiser , which was sunk by torpedo launched by the submarine . The destroyer sped to the spot to pick up survivors, weaving to avoid the same fate. Despite the cold water, the destroyer managed to save most of the crew. Returned to screen the squadron, Penn subsequently sighted a submarine and helped to fend off attacks by Zeppelin airships against the British warships.

On 18 January 1917, the destroyer, equipped with anti-submarine paravanes, was one of six used for high speed sweeps of Dogger Bank, although no submarines were found during the operation. The vessel remained part of the Thirteenth Destroyer Flotilla based at Rosyth. On 16 October, the destroyer participated in the Action off Lerwick, escorting the aircraft carrier , which launched aircraft to search for enemy ships. Penn rejoined the screen for the 1st Battle Squadron in time for the Second Battle of Heligoland Bight the following month. The squadron did not engage with the German forces, which was able to escape through a minefield. The destroyer was subsequently transferred to the Fourteenth Destroyer Flotilla.
The flotilla took part in the Royal Navy's response to one of the final sorties of the German High Seas Fleet during the First World War, on 24 April 1918, although the two fleets did not actually meet and the destroyer saw no action.

After the Armistice of 11 November 1918 that ended the war, the Royal Navy returned to a peacetime level of strength and both the number of ships and the amount of personnel needed to be reduced to save money. Penn was declared superfluous to operational requirements. On 17 October 1919, the destroyer was reduced and placed in reserve. However, this did not last long. The harsh conditions of wartime operations, particularly the combination of high speed and the poor weather that is typical of the North Sea, exacerbated by the fact that the hull was not galvanised, meant that the Admiralty decided to retire the ship. On 31 October 1921, Penn was sold to be broken up to W. & A.T.  Burdon.

Pennant numbers

References

Citations

Bibliography

 
 
 
 
 
 
 
 
 
 
 
 
 
 
 
 
 

1916 ships
Admiralty M-class destroyers
Ships built on the River Clyde
World War I destroyers of the United Kingdom